Exguiana postflavida is a species of snout moth in the genus Exguiana. It was described by Harrison Gray Dyar Jr. in 1923, and is known from French Guiana.

References

Moths described in 1923
Phycitini
Moths of South America